6010 Aluminium alloy has Aluminium as the major element, and has silicon, magnesium, manganese and zinc as minor elements.

Chemical composition

Mechanical Properties

Thermal Properties

References 

Aluminium–magnesium–silicon alloys